The Félibrige (in classical Occitan,  in Mistralian spelling) is a literary and cultural association founded in 1854 by Frédéric Mistral and other Provençal writers to defend and promote the Occitan language (also called the ) and literature.

Etymology
The word félibrige is derived from félibre, a Provençal word meaning pupil or follower.

Origins

Le Félibrige was founded at the Château de Font-Ségugne (located in Châteauneuf-de-Gadagne, Vaucluse) on 21 May 1854 (Saint Estelle's day), by seven young Provençal poets: Théodore Aubanel, Jean Brunet, Paul Giéra, Anselme Mathieu, Frédéric Mistral, Joseph Roumanille and Alphonse Tavan. Together, they aimed to restore the Provençal language and codify its orthography.

Its symbol is a seven-pointed star which, as Frederic Mistral writes in Lou tresor dóu Felibrige, is "a tribute to its seven founders".

The movement was launched in Provence but quickly reached the entire Occitania. It spread among Occitanian writers such as Michel Camélat and Simin Palay (from Gascony and Béarn), Albert Arnavielle, Justin Bessou, Jacques and Gabriel Azaïs and Achille Mir (Languedoc), Arsène Vermenouze (Auvergne), Joseph Roux (Limousin), José Mange (Provence), Brémonde de Tarascon (Bouches-du-Rhône), Batisto Bonnet (Gard) and Charles Maurras.

The Félibrige is an organisation focussed on protecting and promoting Occitan language and culture, fighting for recognition of cultural diversity both within France and across the wider world. It is also one of the two organisations represented across Occitania since 1945, along with the Institut d'Estudis Occitans (IEO).

Felebrigian festivals
There is a yearly meeting, Santo Estello, held in a different town in the Pays d'Oc. The traditional banquet is ended with the ritual of the Copa Santa.

There are also other Fêtes Félibréennes:
 Since 1323, the Jeux floraux of Toulouse, considered as the model
 Jeux floraux of Barcelona
 Orange
 In 1868 at Saint-Rémy-de-Provence
 In 1895 at Vic-en-Carladès, with a programme of music and dance (Cabrette)
 In 1900 at the Château de Ventadour, under the name Fête de l'églantine
 In 1902 at Béziers
 In June 1903 and in 2009 at Sceaux
 In 1907 at Mauvezin, in the Hautes-Pyrénées
 In August 1914, at Sauveterre-de-Béarn
 At Puy-en-Velay
 In 1935 at Monistrol-sur-Loire
 Perhaps Argentat, after 1935 with the Chorale des gabariers de la Dordogne

The Jardin des Félibres in Sceaux
In 1950 Sceaux, Hauts-de-Seine (one of the Parisien banlieue) was named Cité Félibréenne. A memorial garden for this event was created around the tomb of Jean-Pierre Claris de Florian, a French poet and romancier, well known for his fables and a noted Félibrigist (perhaps because his mother was Castilian). The garden displays eleven busts in all.

The garden is located behind the church of Saint Jean-Baptiste (Saint John the Baptist) in Sceaux. The entry, signed: Parc de Sceaux, Jardin des Félibres is located on Avenue du Président Franklin Roosevelt in Sceaux.

Capouliés of the Félibrige 
 1876–1888: Frédéric Mistral
 1888–1891: Joseph Roumanille
 1891–1901: Félix Gras
 1901–1909: Pierre Devoluy
 1909–1919: Valère Bernard
 1919–1922: Joseph Fallen
 1922–1941: Marius Jouveau
 1941–1956: Frédéric Mistral
 1956–1962: Charles Rostaing
 1962–1971: Elie Bachas
 1971–1982: René Jouveau
 1982–1989: Paul Roux
 1989–1992: Paul Pons
 1992–2006: Pierre Fabre
 2006–2022: Jacques Mouttet
 2022–: Paulin Reynard

See also
François-Juste-Marie Raynouard
Occitan
Provençal dialect
Niçois
Troubadour
La Coupo Santo
Le Jardin des Félibres in Sceaux

References

Sources
 Eugène Lintilhac, Les Félibres, 1895, édition Alphonse Lemerre, in-12°, 136 p. Première partie - Félibres et Félibrige : L'énigme du Félibrige : les félibres de Paris, Cigaliers et félibres de Paris, le royaume poètique de Sainte-Estelle le capoulié Félix Gras, Un jour de printemps chez Mistral. Deuxième partie - Théodore Aubanel, La genése du Félibrige et Aubanel, le mouvement de Mistral, Jasmin, l'oeuvre d'Aubanel.
 La Plume, revue littéraire artistique et sociale, Paris, dir. Léon Deschamps, n° 53 du 1 juillet 1891, p. 213–237 du recueil annuel. (Numéro consacré au Félibrige à l’occasion de la mort de Joseph Roumanille)
 Émile Ripert, La Renaissance Provençale, Paris, Librairie Champion, 1918
 Émile Ripert, Le Félibrige, Armand Colin, 1924 ; réédition Éditions Jeanne Laffitte, 2001 
 René Jouveau, Histoire du Félibrige (4 volumes), Imprimerie Bené, Nîmes, 1970–1979 ; réédition 1984-1987
 Valère Bernard, Bagatouni, rééd. Alandis Editions, 2000.
 Philippe Martel, Les Félibres et leur temps : Renaissance d'oc et opinion (1850-1914), Bordeaux, PUB, 2010

External links

Félibrige
History of Félibrige on NotreProvence.fr
Felibrige sur lexilogos
La Plume, n° 53 du 1 juillet 1891 (pdf) (cité supra dans la bibliographie)
Conférence de Paul Ruat sur "le Félibrige", 8 février 1905.
Lou Tresor dóu Felibrige online

French literature
Literary movements
Occitan literature
Frédéric Mistral